The 2006 Camden Council election took place on 4 May 2006 to elect members of Camden London Borough Council in London, England. The whole council was up for election and the Labour Party lost overall control of the council to no overall control.

Background
Before the election the Labour party controlled the council with 36 seats, compared to 11 Conservatives and 7 Liberal Democrats. Since the 2002 election, in 2005, one of the councillors for Fortune Green, Jonathan Simpson, had defected from the Liberal Democrats to Labour.

A total of 223 candidates stood for the 54 seats being contested in 18 wards. The Labour, Conservative, Liberal Democrat and Green parties contested every seat and there was 1 candidate each from the Christian Peoples Alliance, Respect Party and United Kingdom Independence Party, as well as 4 independents.

Labour Prime Minister Tony Blair visited Camden during the campaign to support his party.

Election result
The results saw Labour lose their majority on the council with the leader of the council Raj Chada among those who were defeated. This was the first time since the 1968 election that Labour had not won a majority in Camden and the election saw the Liberal Democrats overtake Labour to become the largest party on the council. The defeated Labour leader of the council Raj Chadha said "that the national circumstances meant a very good council in Camden has been lost". Overall turnout at the election was 37.6%, an increase from 28.5% in 2002.

Following the election the Liberal Democrats and Conservatives made an agreement to form the administration together, with Liberal Democrat Keith Moffitt becoming the leader of the council and Conservative Andrew Marshall becoming deputy leader.

|}

Ward results
Existing Councillor seeking re-election is denoted by an asterisk (*).

Belsize

Bloomsbury

Camden Town with Primrose Hill

Cantelowes

Fortune Green

Frognal and Fitzjohns

Gospel Oak

Hampstead Town

Haverstock

Highgate

Holborn and Covent Garden

Kentish Town

Kilburn

King's Cross

Regent's Park

St Pancras and Somers Town

Swiss Cottage

West Hampstead

References

2006
2006 London Borough council elections